KZOZ (93.3 FM) is a commercial radio station that is licensed to and serves San Luis Obispo, California. The station is owned by American General Media and broadcasts a classic rock format.

History
The station's first license was granted in 1962 to John C. Cohan with the call letters . In November 1965, Cohan sold  and its AM counterpart to West Coast Broadcasters Inc., owner of TV station KSBY (channel 6) in San Luis Obispo, for $360,000. The new owner then changed the FM station's call sign to KSBY-FM.

In June 1975, KSBY-FM changed its call sign to KZOZ. At the time, the station was branded as "KZOZ Stereo 93" and aired an album-oriented rock format.

The 1980s brought several major changes at the station. On June 17, 1980, KZOZ adjusted its call sign to KZOZ-FM and flipped to top 40 with the branding "Z93". The station reverted to the KZOZ call letters on November 10, 1986. In December 1987, Phoenix Broadcasting Company sold KZOZ and then-sister station KKAL to Tattersall-Commonwealth Broadcasters Company for $3,615,000. The combo changed hands again in February 1989, when Tattersall-Commonwealth sold the pair to Anthony Brandon and L. Rogers Brandon for $2 million. The Brandons' radio company would later be known as American General Media.

On October 14, 1991, KZOZ switched formats from top 40 to classic rock, dropping its longtime "Z93" branding.

In 2003, KZOZ hired David Atwood as programming director. Atwood adjusted the station's music library in an active rock direction, adding newer songs alongside the existing classic rock as a response to the rise of modern rock rival KURQ. In the Arbitron fall 2004 radio ratings survey, KZOZ finished in first place in the San Luis Obispo market in the 12+ demographic.

As of July 2018, programming on KZOZ includes Jeff & Jeremy, a local morning show that has aired since February 2006, and Off The Record with Joe Benson, a nationally syndicated one-hour classic rock show.

References

External links

Jeff & Jeremy (KZOZ morning show)

Classic rock radio stations in the United States
ZOZ
Mass media in San Luis Obispo County, California
Radio stations established in 1961
1961 establishments in California